Donald Elliott may refer to:
Donald B. Elliott (born 1931), member of the Maryland House of Delegates
Donnie Elliott (born 1968), baseball player
Donald R. Elliott, visual effects artist 
Don Elliott (1926–1984), American jazz musician
Don Elliott Heald (1922–2009), American radio announcer
 Don Elliot (rower) (born 1929), English rower
 Donald H. Elliott (1932–2021), American urban planner
Don Elliott (cricketer) from List of Rhodesian representative cricketers